Paul Joseph Cook (born March 3, 1943) is an American politician serving as a San Bernardino County Supervisor since 2020. A member of the Republican Party, he was previously elected to the Yucca Valley Town Council from 1998 to 2006, California State Assembly for the 65th district until 2012, and the U.S. representative for California's 8th congressional district from 2013 to 2020.

In September 2019, Cook announced that he would not run for re-election to Congress in 2020, and instead run for a seat on the San Bernardino County Board of Supervisors. In the March 3, 2020 primary election, Cook defeated three opponents with an outright majority to avoid a November runoff and succeed Robert A. Lovingood, making him the San Bernardino County Supervisor from the 1st district. Cook assumed office on December 7, 2020.

Early life and education
Cook was born in Meriden, Connecticut in 1943. He was raised in Meriden and did not permanently move to California until the end of his military career. In 1966, he graduated from Southern Connecticut State University, earning a B.S. in teaching. Later that year, he joined the United States Marine Corps. As an infantry officer, Cook served in the Vietnam War. His actions in combat earned him many honors, including the Bronze Star and two Purple Hearts. He served in the Marine Corps for 26 years.

After he retired from the Marine Corps in 1992 as a colonel, he earned an MPA from California State University, San Bernardino in 1996 and a master's in political science from University of California Riverside in 2000.

Early career
From 1993 to 1994, he was Director of Yucca Valley Chamber of Commerce. From 1998 to 2002, he was a professor at Copper Mountain College. Cook taught courses on political violence and terrorism at University of California Riverside since 2002.

California Assembly

Elections
In 2006, Cook ran for California's 65th Assembly District. Cook won a five candidate Republican primary field with 29% of the vote. In the general election, Cook defeated Democrat Rita Ramirez-Dean 60%–37%. In 2008, he won re-election to a second term, defeating Democrat Carl Wood 53%–47%. In 2010, he won re-election to a third term, defeating Wood again 58%–42%.

Tenure
The 65th district included the cities of Banning, Beaumont, Big Bear Lake, Calimesa, Cherry Valley, Hemet, Moreno Valley, Perris, San Jacinto, Sun City, Twentynine Palms, Yucaipa, Yucca Valley and other smaller communities and unincorporated areas in Riverside County, San Bernardino County, Inyo County and Mono County.

The California Chamber of Commerce and the California Taxpayers Association gave Cook a perfect 100% rating, 2007–2011. In 2010, Democratic Speaker of the Assembly John Pérez appointed Cook to chair the Veterans Affairs Committee, the first time a Democratic speaker had appointed a Republican to chair a committee since 2002.

Committee assignments
 Accountability and Administrative Review Committee
 Budget Committee
 Emergency Management Committee
 Governmental Organization Committee
 Higher Education Committee
 Inland Empire Transportation Issues Committee
 Master Plan for Higher Education
 Preservation of California's Entertainment Industry Committee
 Sunset Review Committee
 Veterans Affairs Committee (Chair)
Judiciary Committee

U.S. House of Representatives

2012 campaign

In January 2012, 34-year incumbent Jerry Lewis announced he would not seek re-election in November. Cook entered the primary for the district, which had been renumbered from the 41st to the 8th in redistricting. He finished second in the 13-candidate all-party open primary. He earned 15% of the vote. Fellow Republican and conservative activist Gregg Imus ranked first with 16% of the vote. Cook was endorsed by the California Off-Road Vehicle Association (CORVA) past presidents, the San Bernardino Sun, National Vietnam and Gulf War Veterans Coalition, the County Farm Bureau, state Assemblyman Steve Knight, state Senator Sharon Runner, and U.S. Congressman Ed Royce. In the November election, Cook defeated Imus 58%–42%.

Tenure 

In 2013, Cook co-signed a letter to then-president Barack Obama, urging him to finalize the Keystone XL pipeline, stating that it was about "jobs, jobs jobs." He also expressed fear that China "is ready to take advantage of America's missteps with the Keystone pipeline."

Early in 2017, Cook voted in favor of repealing the Affordable Care Act. His reason for voting for the repeal was to ensure that "every American has access to quality care to fit their budget." In August 2017, he voted in favor of outlawing late term abortions, unless the woman was a victim of rape or incest or that her life was threatened.

Cook voted in favor of the Tax Cuts and Jobs Act of 2017. By voting for the bill, Cook says that the bill will "deliver crucial tax relief for middle-class and low-income Americans." He voted for this bill because more than 90 percent of taxpaying constituents will receive a tax break. He also supports it because it simplifies the tax code.

Committee assignments
 Committee on Armed Services
 Subcommittee on Tactical Air and Land Forces
 Subcommittee on Seapower and Projection Forces
 Committee on Foreign Affairs
 Subcommittee on Europe and Eurasia
 Subcommittee on Terrorism, Nonproliferation, and Trade
 Committee on Veterans' Affairs
 Subcommittee on Disability Assistance and Memorial Affairs
 Subcommittee on Economic Opportunity

Caucus memberships
 Congressional Cement Caucus
 House Baltic Caucus
Republican Main Street Partnership
Congressional Western Caucus

Political positions 
In the first session of the 115th United States Congress, Cook was ranked the 33rd most bipartisan member of the House by the Bipartisan Index, a metric published by The Lugar Center and Georgetown's McCourt School of Public Policy to assess congressional bipartisanship.

Cook opposes abortion. Cook opposes Common Core State Standards.

Cook supports repealing the Affordable Care Act ("Obamacare"). He supports legislation that "decreases premiums, makes it easier for employers to offer affordable healthcare options for their employees, and allows greater freedom for people to purchase a plan of their choice."

Cook believes that the Deferred Action for Childhood Arrivals (DACA) is unconstitutional.

Personal life
Cook resides in Apple Valley, California with his wife, Jeanne.

Electoral history

References

External links

 
 
 
 Join California Paul Cook

|-

|-

1943 births
21st-century American politicians
United States Marine Corps personnel of the Vietnam War
California city council members
California State University, San Bernardino alumni
Educators from California
Living people
Mayors of places in California
Republican Party members of the California State Assembly
Military personnel from California
Military personnel from Connecticut
Politicians from Meriden, Connecticut
People from Yucca Valley, California
Republican Party members of the United States House of Representatives from California
Southern Connecticut State University alumni
United States Marine Corps officers
University of California, Riverside alumni
University of California, Riverside faculty